César Leopoldo Camacho Manco (born 15 April 1943 in Lima, Peru), better known as simply César Camacho, is a Peruvian-born Brazilian mathematician and former director of the IMPA. His area of research is dynamical systems theory.

Camacho earned his Ph.D. from the University of California, Berkeley in 1971 under the supervision of Stephen Smale.

He is a member of the Brazilian Academy of Sciences and a recipient of 1996 TWAS Prize.

Selected publications
C. Camacho, P. Sad. "Invariant varieties through singularities of holomorphic vector fields", Annals of Mathematics, 1982
C. Camacho, A. L. Neto, P. Sad. "Topological invariants and equidesingularization for holomorphic vector fields", Journal of Differential Geometry, 1984

References

1943 births
Living people
Members of the Brazilian Academy of Sciences
Dynamical systems theorists
People from Lima
Instituto Nacional de Matemática Pura e Aplicada researchers
20th-century Brazilian mathematicians
TWAS laureates